This Century was an American pop rock band from Phoenix, Arizona. It consisted of members Joel Kanitz, Ryan Gose, Sean Silverman, and Alex Silverman. They were signed to Action Theory records, under Warner Bros.  The band has three full-length albums: Sound of Fire, Biography of Heartbreak, and Soul Sucker as well as 7 EPs.

Albums

Studio albums

Extended plays

Featured Albums

Singles

Music videos

References

External links
 
 Facebook
 Twitter
 Youtube

Discographies of American artists